Multistory Media (formerly known as Shiver) is a British television production company. It is a subsidiary of ITV Studios and one of the largest providers of factual entertainment in the United Kingdom.

Some of its productions include Paul O'Grady: For the Love of Dogs, 60 Minute Makeover and Peter Andre: My Life.

History
Originally, Multistory Media was the factual entertainment and features network production departments of Tyne Tees Television and Yorkshire Television. When ITV Plc was created the separate departments of these two subsidiaries were merged into Yorkshire Television and they were branded as Granada Productions North Factual Entertainment and Features. They were then renamed as the northern factual entertainment and features department within ITV Yorkshire part of ITV Productions. At this point an internal re-organisation took place to disband the management structure of Yorkshire Television and transfer the production business from Yorkshire Television Limited to ITV Productions Limited. The departments were then closed as part of a wider company production review but were re-opened in Leeds as Shiver, a subsidiary of ITV Studios.

On 23 May 2019, Shiver changed their name to Multistory Media.

Productions

References

External links

Companies based in Leeds
ITV (TV network)
Mass media companies based in Greater Manchester
Television production companies of the United Kingdom